Mattia Drudi (born 16 July 1998) is an Italian racing driver who currently competes in the GT World Challenge Europe for Attempto Racing.

Career

Early career
Drudi begin his karting career in 2005, at the age of 7, in his native Italy. In 2009, he claimed three karting titles, taking the 60cc class titles in the Easykart Italy, Easykart European (Cadet), and Campeonato Area Centro series. Two years later, he won the 100cc class of the Easykart European series; his final major championship in karting before transitioning to single-seaters after 2014.

He began his single-seater career in Formula 4 machinery, taking part in the Italian F4 Championship, first with Cram Motorsport before finishing the season with F & M. In just his fifth race in the championship (the second race at Imola), Drudi scored his first victory in the series. Drudi would finish the season second in the championship, with five races victories and ten podiums. Three of these victories came in a weekend sweep at Monza in September. In the offseason, Drudi conducted a series of tests with Campos Racing in Formula Three machinery, but elected to stay at the F4 level for 2015, joining SMG Swiss Motorsport Group for the inaugural season of the ADAC Formula 4 series.

Sports car racing

Porsche spec series
In late 2014, Drudi competed in the annual Porsche Italia rookie test, where he was identified by Maurizio Lusuardi of Dinamic Motorsport, who wished to field an entry for Mattia in the Porsche Carrera Cup Italy for 2015. His single-seater commitments initially derailed this move, but in March 2015 Drudi officially signed with the team to compete full-time in the national spec series. In his debut season, Drudi claimed nine podiums and one victory in 13 races, finishing third in the championship. Drudi's season also included one-off Guest-class appearances in both the Porsche Supercup and Porsche Carrera Cup Germany. 2016 would see Drudi continue with Dinamic Motorsport, taking nine wins and 16 podiums en route to a second-place finish in the 2016 Porsche Carrera Cup Italia. He made a further three appearances as a guest in the Porsche Supercup in 2016, taking a podium at his home race at Monza. For 2017, Drudi competed full-time in the Porsche Supercup for the first time in his career, once again with Dinamic Motorsport. Through the 11-race season, he claimed one podium, once again at Monza, taking 6th in the championship. His final season in the series in 2018 saw him claim four podiums en route to a fifth place finish in the championship.

GT racing

In late 2018, Drudi made his debut in the Italian GT Championship, driving for Audi Sport Italia. In his third race with the team, at Monza, he and co-driver Bar Baruch won the GT3 class, marking Drudi's first race victory in GT3 machinery. In August 2018, Drudi made his debut in prototype machinery, competing with Eurointernational at the Silverstone and Spa rounds of the 2018 European Le Mans Series. His Ligier JS P3 finished 10th and 13th in class respectively. 

In February 2019, Drudi was signed to Audi's factory GT lineup, joining the marque's customer racing roster. His 2019 season primarily consisted of a dual GT World Challenge Europe Sprint Cup and Endurance Cup campaign with Attempto Racing, alongside a partial season in the ADAC GT Masters with EFP Car Collection by TECE. He found his greatest successes that season in the Sprint Cup, where he and co-driver Milan Dontje would claim five podiums and a class victory competing in the Silver Cup class. Prior to the 2020 season, Drudi and fellow Audi factory driver Kelvin van der Linde took part in the mid-season Formula E rookie test. For 2020, Drudi moved to the Pro class with Attempto Racing, adding a trio of appearances in the Intercontinental GT Challenge. In October, he partnered with Patric Niederhauser and Frédéric Vervisch to finish second overall at the 24 Hours of Spa. The podium finish helped boost he and Vervisch's position in the 2020 GT World Challenge Europe Endurance Cup classification, but a 36th place finish and retirement in the opening two rounds would force the pair to settle for 12th in the overall standings. The 2021 GT World Challenge Europe campaign saw Drudi's entries score no podiums and a combined 13.5 points, enough for 25th and 26th in the Endurance and Sprint Cups respectively. However, Drudi found great success in 2021 in another endurance cup, taking the GT3-class crown in the 2021 Italian GT Championship Endurance Cup. It marked Drudi's first championship title in seven years of competition in senior motorsport.

2022 saw Drudi join Car Collection Motorsport's entry in the GT World Challenge Europe, taking part in both the Sprint and Endurance Cups. Drudi expressed his confidence ahead of the season, claiming that the team could fight for overall race victories. Alongside Luca Ghiotto and Christopher Haase in the Endurance Cup, Drudi finished 24th in the overall points classification, scoring all 12 points in a fourth-place finish at Imola. In the Sprint Cup, with Ghiotto again as his co-driver, Drudi would come home 10th, registering a season-high finish of fifth at Magny-Cours.

Drudi began his 2023 campaign at the Bathurst 12 Hour, although his car would retire early in the race following a crash. Drudi returned to his factory driver duties at the Kyalami 9 Hours, where he finished third overall alongside co-drivers Ricardo Feller and Patric Niederhauser. His partnership with Feller continued throughout the 2023 season, where the two shared Tresor Orange1's Audi for the full GT World Challenge Europe campaign. Fellow factory driver Dennis Marschall joined the entry for the Endurance Cup.

Personal life
Mattia's father, Luca, is a former racing driver. Luca is a two-time 24 Hours of Le Mans class winner, taking victory with Viper Team Oreca in 1998 and Seikel Motorsport in 2001.

Racing record

Career summary

* Season still in progress.

Complete GT World Challenge Europe results

GT World Challenge Europe Endurance Cup

GT World Challenge Europe Sprint Cup

References

External links
Mattia Drudi at Autosport

1998 births
Living people
Italian racing drivers
Italian F4 Championship drivers
ADAC Formula 4 drivers
Porsche Supercup drivers
European Le Mans Series drivers
Blancpain Endurance Series drivers
ADAC GT Masters drivers
24H Series drivers
Nürburgring 24 Hours drivers
Audi Sport drivers
Cram Competition drivers
EuroInternational drivers
W Racing Team drivers
Phoenix Racing drivers
Target Racing drivers
Porsche Carrera Cup Germany drivers